Maria Grazia Spillantini , is Professor of Molecular Neurology in the Department of Clinical Neurosciences at the University of Cambridge. She is most noted for identifying the protein alpha-synuclein as the major component of Lewy bodies, the characteristic protein deposit found in the brain in Parkinson's disease and dementia with Lewy bodies. She has also identified mutations in the MAPT gene as a heritable cause for frontotemporal dementia.

Education
Spillantini completed a laurea in biological sciences at the University of Florence, graduating summa cum laude. She remained at the University of Florence, moving to the Department of Clinical Pharmacology to conduct research. After research posts at INSERM Unité de Neurobiologie in Paris, and the Molecular Neurobiology Unit of the Medical Research Council in Cambridge UK, she began her PhD at the Laboratory of Molecular Biology. Spillantini was affiliated with Peterhouse college during this time. She was awarded a PhD in molecular biology in 1993. Spillantini is Fellow of Clare Hall, Cambridge since 1994.

Career and research
Spillantini was interviewed for a young researchers fellowship in 1991 by Nobel prize winner Rita Levi-Montalcini. On Levi-Montalcini's death in 2013, Spillantini told The Scientist magazine, “I was very nervous because she was a very well-known scientist. And it was really for me one of nicest experiences because she was really down to earth.” 

 Spillantini is based at the University of Cambridge, where she is Professor of Molecular Neurology at the Department of Clinical Neurosciences. Her research examines the mechanisms leading to neurodegeneration in diseases such as Alzheimer's disease, Parkinson's disease and frontotemporal dementia. In particular her work studies the role of microtubule-associated protein tau and alpha-synuclein aggregation in the neurodegenerative process.

References

British women biologists
British women neuroscientists
Italian women neuroscientists
Fellows of Clare Hall, Cambridge
Fellows of the Royal Society
Italian women scientists
Italian biologists
People from Arezzo
British neuroscientists
Italian neuroscientists
Academics of the University of Cambridge
Female Fellows of the Royal Society
Living people
1957 births